Jasminka Francki (born on 15 February 1969 in Zagreb) is a Croatian sport shooter. She competed in rifle shooting events at the 1992 Summer Olympics.

Olympic results

References

1969 births
Living people
ISSF rifle shooters
Croatian female sport shooters
Shooters at the 1992 Summer Olympics
Olympic shooters of Croatia
Sportspeople from Zagreb